The 2 euro coin (€2) is the highest-value euro coin and has been used since the introduction of the euro (in its cash form) in 2002. The coin is used in 22 countries (with 20 legally adopting it) with a collective population of about 341 million. The coin is made of two alloys: the inner part of nickel brass, the outer part of copper-nickel. All coins have a common reverse side and country-specific national sides. The coin has been used since 2002, with the present common side design dating from 2007.

The €2 coin is the euro coin subject to legal-tender commemorative issues and hence there is a large number of national sides, including three issues of identical commemorative sides by all eurozone members.

History 

The coin dates from 2002, when euro coins and notes were introduced in the 12-member eurozone and its related territories. The common side was designed by Luc Luycx, a Belgian artist who won a Europe-wide competition to design the new coins. The designs of the one- and two-euro coins were intended to show the European Union (EU) as a whole with the then-15 countries more closely joined together than on the 10 to 50-cent coins (the 1-cent to 5-cent coins showed the EU as one, though intending to show its place in the world).

The national sides, then 15 (eurozone plus Monaco, San Marino and the Vatican who could mint their own) were each designed according to national competitions, though to specifications which applied to all coins such as the requirement of including twelve stars. National designs were not allowed to change until the end of 2008, unless a monarch (whose portrait usually appears on the coins) dies or abdicates. This happened in Monaco and the Vatican City, resulting in three new designs in circulation (the Vatican had an interim design until the new Pope was selected). National designs have seen some changes due to a new rule stating that national designs should include the name of the issuing country (neither Finland and Belgium show a country name, and hence have made minor changes).

In 2004 the commemorative coins were allowed to be minted in six states (a short interim period was set aside so citizens could get used to the new currency). By 2007 nearly all states had issued a commemorative issue, and the first eurozone-wide commemorative was issued to celebrate the Treaty of Rome.

As the EU's membership has since expanded in 2004 and 2007, with further expansions envisaged, the common face of all euro coins from the value of 10 euro cent and above were redesigned in 2007 to show a new map. This map showed Europe, not just the EU, as one continuous landmass; however, Cyprus was moved west as the map cut off after the Bosphorus (which was seen as excluding Turkey for political reasons). The redesign in 2007, rather than in 2004, was due to the fact that 2007 saw the first enlargement of the eurozone: the entry of Slovenia. Hence, the Slovenian design was added to the designs in circulation.

Cyprus and Malta joined in 2008, Slovakia in 2009 and Estonia in 2011, bringing four more designs. Also in 2009, the second eurozone-wide issue of a 2-euro commemorative coin was issued, celebrating ten years of the introduction of the euro. In 2012, the third eurozone-wide issue of a 2-euro commemorative coin was issued, celebrating 10 years of euro coins and notes. In 2015, the fourth eurozone-wide issue for this denomination was issued, commemorating the 30th anniversary of the flag of Europe. Four more countries, Estonia, Latvia, Lithuania, and Croatia joined the eurozone in 2011, 2014, 2015, and in 2023, respectively.

Design 
The coins are composed of two alloys. The inner circle is composed of three layers (nickel brass, nickel, nickel brass) and the outer ring of copper-nickel giving them a two colour (silver outer and gold inner) appearance. The diameter of the coins is 25.75 mm, the thickness is 2.20 mm and the mass is 8.5 grams. The coins' edges are finely milled with lettering, though the exact design of the edge can vary between states with some choosing to write the issuing state's name or denomination around the edge (see "edges" below). The coins have been used from 2002, though some are dated 1999 which is the year the euro was created as a currency, but not put into general circulation.

Reverse (common) side 
The reverse (used from 2007 onwards) was designed by Luc Luycx and displays a map of Europe, not including Iceland and cutting off, in a semicircle, at the Bosporus, north through the middle of Ukraine and Belarus and through northern Scandinavia. Cyprus is located further west than it should be and Malta is shown disproportionally large so it appears on the map. The map has numerous indentations giving an appearance of geography rather than a flat design. Six fine lines cut across the map except where there is landmass and have a star at each end – reflecting the twelve stars on the flag of Europe. Across the map is the word EURO, and a large number 2 appears to the left hand side of the coin. The designer's initials, LL, appear next to Cyprus.

Luc Luycx designed the original coin, which was much the same except the design was only of the then 15 members in their entirety and showing border and no geographic features. The map was less detailed and the lines the stars were upon cut through where there would be landmass in eastern Europe if it were shown.

Obverse (national) sides 
The obverse side of the coin depends on the issuing country. All have to include twelve stars (in most cases a circle around the edge), the engraver's initials, and the year of issue. New designs also have to include the name or initials of the issuing country. The side cannot repeat the denomination of the coin unless the issuing country uses an alphabet other than Latin (currently, Greece is the only such country, hence it engraves "2 ΕΥΡΩ" upon its coins). Austria also engraves "2 EURO" on the reverse of its coins.

Edges 
The edges of the 2 euro coin vary according to the issuing state;

Planned designs 

Austria, Germany and Greece will also at some point need to update their designs to comply with guidelines stating they must include the issuing state's name or initial, and not repeat the denomination of the coin.

In addition, there are several EU states that have not yet adopted the euro, some of them have already agreed upon their coin designs however it is not known exactly when they will adopt the currency, and therefore these are not yet minted. See enlargement of the Eurozone for expected entry dates of these countries. Latvia officially introduced the euro on 1 January 2014, its design for the 2 euro coin is similar to the 5 lati coin's design from 1929 to 1932:

Commemorative issues 

Each state, allowed to issue coins, may also mint two commemorative coins each year (until 2012, it was one a year). Only €2 coins may be used in this way (for them to be legal tender) and there is a limit on the number that can be issued. The coin must show the normal design criteria, such as the twelve stars, the year and the issuing country. Not all states have issued their own commemorative coins except for in 2007, 2009 and 2012 when every then-eurozone state issued a common coin (with only different languages and country names used) to celebrate the 50th anniversary of the Treaty of Rome (1957–2007), the 10th anniversary of the euro (1999–2009) and the 10th anniversary of euro coins (2002–2012). Eurozone-wide issues do not count as a state's two-a-year issue. Germany has begun issuing one coin a year for each of its states (the German Bundesländer series which will take it up to 2021.

Types of Commemorative €2 coins 
There are several types of Commemorative €2 Coins:
 Commemorative coins that the euro countries are issued jointly by all EU Countries
 Commemorative coins issued by a single country
 Commemorative coins issued by a number of countries

Commemorative coins that are issued jointly by all eurozone countries 
So far, there have been four commemorative coins that the eurozone countries have issued jointly: the first, in March 2007, to commemorate the "50th anniversary of the Treaty of Rome", the second, in January 2009, to commemorate the tenth anniversary of the euro is celebrated with a coin called the "10th anniversary of Economic and Monetary Union of the European Union", the third one in 2012, to commemorate 10 years of the euro coins and notes, and the fourth one in 2022 to commemorate 35 years of the Erasmus Programme.

There are €2 commemorative coins that have been issued on the same topic by different member states, two (by Belgium and Italy) to celebrate Louis Braille's 200th birthday, four (by Italy, Belgium, Portugal and Finland) to celebrate 60th anniversary of the Universal Declaration of Human Rights and two (by Germany and France) to commemorate 50 years of the Elysee Treaty (1963–2013).

Commemorative coins issued by a single country 
As a rule, euro countries may each issue only two €2 commemorative coins per year. Exceptionally, they are allowed to issue another, provided that it is a joint issuance and commemorates events of European-wide importance.

Proposing a topic for a €2 Commemorative Coin

Role of the European Central Bank 
Designing and issuing the coins is the competence of the individual euro countries. The ECB's role regarding the commemorative but also all other coins is to approve the maximum volumes of coins that the individual countries may issue.

"Unlike banknotes, euro coins are still a national competence and not the ECB's. If a euro area country intends to issue a €2 commemorative coin it has to inform the European Commission. There is no reporting by euro area countries to the ECB. The Commission publishes the information in the multilingual Official Journal of the EU (C series).

The Official Journal is the authoritative source upon which the ECB bases its website updates on euro coins. The reporting process, the translation into 22 languages and publishing lead to unavoidable delays. The coin pages on the ECB’s website cannot therefore always be updated as timely as users might wish.

If the ECB learns of a euro coin that has not yet featured in the Official Journal, only its image will be posted on the ECB’s website, with a brief statement that confirmation by the European Commission is pending."

Role of the Directorate-General for Economic and Financial Affairs 
The website of the EU – DG for Economic and Financial Affairs is not specific on the topic of proposing themes for €2 commemorative coins.

The website of the European Central Bank where the Euro coins are mentioned, is not specific on the topic of proposing themes for €2 commemorative coins.  It is not mentioned how the €2 commemorative coins that are in circulation today came about.

Similar coins 

The coins were minted in several of the participating countries, many using blanks produced at the Birmingham Mint in Birmingham, England. A problem has arisen in differentiation of coins made using similar blanks and minting techniques.
 The Turkish 1 New Lira coin (which was in circulation from 2005 until 2008) closely resembled the €2 coin in both weight and size, and both coins seem to be recognized and accepted by coin-operated machines as being a €2 coin; however, 2 euros are worth roughly 20 times than 1 Turkish lira. There are now some vending machines which have been upgraded to reject the 1 lira coin.
 The 10 Thai baht coin, first minted in 1988, which is of similar shape and size to a €2 coin but worth around one-eighth of the value has recently been appearing in the coin boxes of vending machines throughout Europe and being given back as change in some smaller establishments.
 The new 50 qəpik coin of the Azerbaijani manat also looks like a €2 coin. The new coin set of the country contains other coins similar to some euro coins.
 The Philippine 10 peso coin is also similar to the 2 Euro coin making it easy to pass for a Euro in some establishments in the Eurozone.
 The Egyptian pound coin is also similar to the 2 Euro coin making it easy to pass for a Euro in some establishments in the Eurozone. It's worth around 12–13 Euro Cents (1/16 of a 2 Euro coin). It is slightly thicker, with a marginally smaller diameter. In everyday exchanges the similarity is effectively misleading. Its use has been attested in Amsterdam.
 The Mexican 5 peso coin is also similar to the 2 Euro coin. It is worth around 28 Euro Cents (1/7 of the 2 Euro coin).
 The Canadian 2-dollar coin or 'Toonie', first minted in 1996, also bears a small similarity to the €2 coin. The toonie however is 2mm larger in diameter, 0.40mm less thick, 1.5g lighter, and features a larger outer ring. It is worth around 1.40 EUR.
 The Polish 5 złotych coin, currently worth about 1.16 EUR. 
 The 1000 Indonesian Rupiah coin, minted between 1993 and 2000, weighs 0.1g more, has a diameter 0.25mm larger and is 0.20mm thinner. The coin is worth approximately €0.06 (1/30th of a €2 coin).
The South African 5 rand is also similar in appearance and size, and is worth around €0.40.
 The Italian 500 lire minted from 1982 to 2001 has a diameter 0.05 larger. The coin was worth approximately €0.25

References

External links 

 

Euro coins
Bi-metallic coins
Two-base-unit coins
Maps on coins